A prefectural university is a university run by a prefectural government.

See also
 National university
 Public university

Types of university or college